Tsento Gewog (Dzongkha: བཙན་ཏོ་) is a gewog (village block) of Paro District, Bhutan. In 2002, the gewog had an area of 575.1 square kilometres and contained 14 villages and 332 households. The border can be accessed through a secret road/trail connecting Phari in China known as Tremo La.

References

Gewogs of Bhutan
Paro District
Bhutan–China border crossings